Sikkim Aakraman Sporting Club is an Indian professional football club based in Gangtok, Sikkim. Founded in 2010, the club competes in the Sikkim Premier League, the top football division in Sikkim.

History 
Sikkim Aakraman FC qualified for the Sikkim Premier Division League in 2016 and lifted the champion’s trophy in same year. It finished as runners-up in 2017 and 2018. The club has also played semi-finals of the prestigious All India Governor’s Gold Cup in 2016 and 2017, and was three-time finalist of the Independence Cup Football Tournament.

Honours

League
Sikkim Premier Division League
Champions (1): 2016
Runners-up (2): 2017, 2018

Cup
Sikkim Gold Cup
Semifinalist (2): 2016, 2017Independence CupRunners-up (3):

 Domestic Tournaments 

 Chandmari Futsal Tournament'''
 Champions (1): 2020

References 

Football clubs in Sikkim
Association football clubs established in 2010
2011 establishments in Sikkim
Sikkim Premier Division League